Charlie Jolley may refer to:
 Charlie Jolley (footballer, born 1936) (1936–2014), English footballer
 Charlie Jolley (footballer, born 2001), English footballer